The 59th running of the Tour of Flanders cycling race in Belgium was held on Sunday 6 April 1975. Belgian Eddy Merckx won the classic a second time. The race started in Ghent and finished in Meerbeke (Ninove).

Course
World champion Eddy Merckx concluded his second win after another memorable raid to the finish. Merckx broke clear from the peloton on the Oude Kwaremont together with fellow Belgian Frans Verbeeck with 104 km to ride. Merckx and Verbeeck continued working for the remainder of the course, until Merckx distanced his worn-out companion in Denderwindeke, 6 km before the finish in Meerbeke. The best of the other riders came in at more than five minutes.

Climbs
There were eight categorized climbs:

Results

References

Tour of Flanders
Tour of Flanders
Tour of Flanders
1975 Super Prestige Pernod